Jachcha ki Baori is a large stepwell near the Narsinghji Temple (a Hindu temple in Prahlad Kund located upon the western outskirts of Hindaun in the Indian state of Rajasthan). It is located near the intersection of Prahlad Kund Road and Kharata Road.

History
The stepwell is said to have been built by Bhai Lakhi Rai Banjara. According to legend, no water had appeared during its initial excavation. However, it is rumored a saint had asserted that when a Jachcha (a pregnant woman) gave birth to a child the stepwell filled with water. People report that when the water is drained for cleaning, the stone statue of this woman can be seen lying in the center of the stepwell. This is apparently how the stepwell received its name, Jachcha Ki Baori.

According to folk tradition, the water of this boudi (a Bengali term referring to a married woman, specifically the wife of one's eldest brother) can clean clothing without the use of soap.

Structure

There is no question that the construction of this stepwell was deliberately done in an artistic manner. Stairs to reach the water at its bottom are prominent in the 200 square foot stepwell. For reasons unknown, its four corners each have a pillar. In addition to the statue of a reclining Jachcha, found within the stepwell is an explanation of how the land was irrigated, as well as an ancient house which now resembles a crescent.

The Rajasthan state government repaired the stepwell in 2017 as part of a drive for water conservation.

References

External links 

Buildings and structures completed in the 14th century
Stepwells in Rajasthan
Tourist attractions in Karauli district
14th-century establishments in India
Hindaun
Tourist attractions in Hindaun
Hindaun Block